Dritan Mehmeti (born 9 January 1980) is a former Albanian footballer and manager.

References

1980 births
Living people
Footballers from Tirana
Albanian footballers
Association football midfielders
Besa Kavajë players
KF Butrinti players
KF Delvina players
Kategoria Superiore players
Kategoria e Parë players
Albanian football managers
FK Dinamo Tirana managers
KF Korabi Peshkopi managers
FK Partizani Tirana managers